The Cudahy Packing Plant was a division of the Cudahy Packing Company located at South 36th and O Streets in South Omaha, Nebraska. The plant was opened in 1885 and closed in 1967. The plant included more than 20 buildings that were one to six stories tall, covering five square blocks. It was located on the South Omaha Terminal Railway, and next to the Omaha Stockyards, making Cudahy one of the "Big Four" packing companies in Omaha.

History 

Sir Thomas Lipton of London started a plant in South Omaha, and sold it to the Armour-Cudahy Company in 1887. In 1890, Philip Armour withdrew his interest, and the plant became known for as the Cudahy Brothers' solely. There were a number of large riots and civil unrest that originated or included events at the Cudahy Packing Plant.

See also 
 History of Omaha, Nebraska
 Economy of Omaha, Nebraska

References

External links 
 Historic photo called "Men at Work in the Edible Tank Room at the Cudahy Packing Plant"
 Historic photo called "Cudahy Packing Company Employees"

Former buildings and structures in Omaha, Nebraska
Meatpacking industry in Omaha, Nebraska
History of South Omaha, Nebraska
1885 establishments in Nebraska
1967 disestablishments in Nebraska
Industrial buildings completed in 1885